Liu Guoliang (born January 10, 1976) is a retired Chinese table tennis player who has won all titles at major world tournaments including World Championships, World Cup and Olympic Games. He is the second man to achieve a career grand slam of three majors (Olympic Gold, World Cup, World Championships). He is considered by many to be one of the greatest players and coaches of all time. He has also played with Kong Linghui in doubles.

Biography
Liu Guoliang was born in Xinxiang, Henan. He won two gold medals in the 1996 Summer Olympics, the men's singles and the men's doubles (with Kong Linghui), he won the men's singles in the 1996 World Cup, the World Doubles Championships in 1997 and 1999 with doubles partner Kong Linghui, and the 1999 World Singles Championships in Eindhoven. He was a member of the winning Chinese team in both the 1995 and 1997 World Table Tennis Championships.

Liu retired after the 2001 season and was appointed as the head coach of the China's National Men's Team at the age of 27. As the head coach of the Chinese Men's National Table Tennis Team he is the most successful coach in history with a team gold medal at the 2008 Summer Olympics in addition to the medal sweep by Ma Lin, Wang Hao, and Wang Liqin. At the 2012 Summer Olympics the team won gold and Zhang Jike and Wang Hao won gold and silver medals respectively in the men's singles. At the 2016 Summer Olympics the team again won gold and Ma Long and Zhang Jike won the gold and silver medals in the men's singles.

The Chinese team has also won every men's singles teams championships in the World Table Tennis Championships since Liu became head coach; a period spanning from 2001 to 2018.

On December 1, 2018, Liu was elected as president of the Chinese Table Tennis Association, replacing Cai Zhenhua.

2021 
In June, Liu stated that unlike in previous Olympic games, he did not want to place pressure on the Chinese players and coaches to sweep all the gold medals at the Tokyo Olympics.

Equipment
His playing style is based on the use of short pimple-out rubber and he uses a penholder grip. He is the forerunner of the backhand reverse topspin. His blade is Stiga Clipper, his forehand rubber is Stiga Clippa and his reverse backhand rubber is Stiga Mendo Energy.

During his prime (1996–1999) Liu played with TSP Spinpips on his forehand and Mark V on his backhand, yet still on the Stiga Clipper blade. The Spinpip rubbers was banned in the late 2000 and their counterpart Spinpip Md the year after. Both times because of the aspect ratio (ratio of pips height to width) and its structure of the pip and the arrangement of the pips that made the rubber extremely spinny and unpredictable; and therefore judged to be too advantageous. It is therefore uncertain if Liu actually ever played with Stiga rubbers in competition.

Family
Liu Guoliang's older brother, Liu Guodong, was the head coach of the Indonesia table tennis national team.

References

External links
ITTF stats
Chinese Olympic Committee profile
Liu Guoliang at Table Tennis Media

1976 births
Asian Games gold medalists for China
Asian Games medalists in table tennis
Asian Games silver medalists for China
Chinese male table tennis players
Chinese sports executives and administrators
Living people
Medalists at the 1996 Summer Olympics
Medalists at the 1998 Asian Games
Medalists at the 2000 Summer Olympics
Olympic bronze medalists for China
Olympic gold medalists for China
Olympic medalists in table tennis
Olympic silver medalists for China
Olympic table tennis players of China
World Table Tennis Championships medalists
People from Xinxiang
Shanghai Jiao Tong University alumni
Table tennis players at the 1996 Summer Olympics
Table tennis players at the 1998 Asian Games
Table tennis players at the 2000 Summer Olympics
Table tennis players from Henan